Chassalia curviflora is a species of flowering plant in the family Rubiaceae. Its common names include curved flower woody chassalia and wan guan hua. It is native to South and East Asia (from India to China and Indonesia).

References

Psychotrieae
Flora of China
Flora of tropical Asia